The 1978 United States Senate election in South Dakota was held on November 7, 1978. Incumbent Democratic U.S. Senator James Abourezk did not run for re-election to a second term, but was succeeded by his political rival, Republican U.S. Representative Larry Pressler.

Democratic primary

Candidates
 Don Barnett, former Mayor of Rapid City
 Kenneth D. Stofferahn, farmer and former Republican State Representative from Humboldt

Results

Republican primary

Candidates
 Larry Pressler, U.S. Representative from Humboldt
 Ron Williamson, businessman from Sioux Falls

Results

General election

Results

See also 
 1978 United States Senate elections

References 

South Dakota
1978
1978 South Dakota elections